Living in Clip is a live album by singer-songwriter Ani DiFranco, released in 1997. The title is from a comment made by live sound engineer Larry Berger, indicating that the amplifiers weren't merely being overdriven into clipping occasionally (which is not uncommon in live sound situations); they were clipping so much that they were "living in clip". Rolling Stone named it one of "The Essential Recordings of the ‘90s".

Track listing
All songs by Ani DiFranco, except where noted.

Disc one
"Whatever" – 1:46 (Albuquerque, NM)
"Wherever" – 0:06 (Santa Ana, NM)
"Gravel" – 4:11 (New London, CT)
"Willing to Fight" – 4:12 (Sacramento, CA)
"Shy" – 4:29 (Houston, TX)
"Joyful Girl" – 4:26 (Eugene, OR)
"Hide and Seek" – 4:34 (Hightstown, NJ)
"Napoleon" – 4:54 (Northampton, MA)
"I'm No Heroine" – 4:16 (Berkeley, CA)
"Amazing Grace" (John Newton) – 6:17 (Buffalo, NY)
"Anticipate" – 3:47 (Ithaca, NY)
"Tiptoe" – 0:37 (dunno)
"Sorry I Am" – 4:46 (New York, NY)
"The Slant/The Diner" – 8:22 (Atlanta, GA)
"32 Flavors" – 4:48 (Boulder, CO)
"Out of Range" – 4:27 (Portland, OR)

Disc two
"Untouchable Face" – 3:36 (Bloomington, Ill)
"Shameless" – 4:35 (Portland, OR)
"Distracted" – 1:08 (San Francisco, CA)
"Adam and Eve" – 5:36 (New York, NY)
"Fire Door" – 4:03 (Worcester, MA)
"Both Hands" – 4:52 (Buffalo, NY)
"Out of Habit" – 3:40 (Arcata, CA)
"Every State Line" – 3:55 (Atlanta, GA)
"Not So Soft" – 4:00 (New York, NY)
"Travel Tips" – 1:05 (Spokane, WA)
"Wrong With Me" – 1:57 (Ithaca, NY)
"In or Out" – 3:22 (New York, NY)
"We're All Gonna Blow" – 2:41 (Victoria, BC)
"Letter to a John" – 3:58 (San Francisco, CA)
"Overlap" – 11:28 (New York, NY)

Personnel
Ani DiFranco – acoustic guitar, bass, vocals
Sara Lee – guitar, bass, vocals, bass pedals
Doc Severinsen – conductor on "Amazing Grace" and "Both Hands"
Buffalo Philharmonic Orchestra on "Amazing Grace" and "Both Hands"
Andy Stochansky – harmonica, percussion, drums, vocals

Production

Ani DiFranco  – record producer, mixing, design, layout design, photography
Andrew Gilchrist – mixing
Chris Bellman – mastering 
James Mabry ("Amazing Grace" and "Both Hands") – arranger
Adam Sloan – design, layout design
Asia Kepka – photography
Susan Alzner – photography
Scot Fisher – photography
Matt Hagen – photography
Thomas Hoebbel – photography
Liam King – photography
Dan Koeck – photography
Heidi Kunkel – photography
Liz Marshall – photography
Andy Stochansky – photography
Asia Kepka – cover photo

Charts
Album

References

Ani DiFranco live albums
1997 live albums
Righteous Babe live albums